Apeace (in Japanese, エーピース; in Korean, 에이피스), formerly known as Double B 21 (더블비21) or Double B, was a South Korean boy band formed and under Golden Goose Entertainment. The group was the largest K-pop boy band, with 21 members, until 30 June 2014, when it changed to 15 members. As of July 29, 2018, it changed into 12 members.

The members were chosen and produced by Kim Kyungwook, known for working with groups such as H.O.T., Shinhwa and TVXQ.

Until 2015, subgroups performed 6 days a week, 2 times a day at K Theater at Yebisu Garden Place in Ebisu, Shibuya, Tokyo. The group now performs monthly concerts throughout Japan.

History

Pre-debut

In 2009, members Hwang Du-hwan and Kim Wan-chul were set to be members of the fifth generation of XING (Crossing(X) in New Genre) (Hangul: 씽) from XING Entertainment.
Several members were models before debuting with Apeace. Ji Hyun-sung, Park Jae-won, Heo Chang-woo, and former member Hwang Seok-hyun and Im Ho-jun were models under DCM Models Management around 2008-2010.  Yoo Dong-ho and Park Jae-won appeared on SBS Star School in 2009 with other models such as Kim Woo-bin. Other members that modeled before debuting were Hong Sung-ho, Song Seung-hyuk, Lee Tae-woo, Choi Yeong-won, Im Yeong-kyun, Kim Seung-hyung, Min Jin-hong, Son Yu-chang, Oh Seung-hyun, and Lee Myung-eun.

Member Yoo Jae-deok (stage name is J.D) appeared on Star King's 100th episode in 2009 as a part of a kid's rock band. He was 12 years old at the time. He later served as the main vocalist for a kids progressive metal band named MetallateM, which was active from 2010-2012.

2010: Debut of Double B 21 with "One" and "S.O.S"

The original line-up of Apeace was called "Double B 21" (or "Double B"). It contained four sub-units: "Sky," "Earth," "River," and "Burning." Sky debuted with the single "One" on Mnet's "M Rookies" on 25 August 2010. All members appeared together for the first time on 24 October 2010 at Lotte World and released their single "S.O.S" on 27 October.

In December, they changed their name to "A-peace" and they promoted S.O.S in Thailand. After a hiatus, several members left: Jung Man-soo, Im Ho-jun, Lee Ha-neul, Hwang Seok-hyun, Im Yeong-kyun, Oh Seung-hyun, and Kim Dae-geon left the group. Kim Dae-geon later became a member of F.cuz.

2011: Debut of Apeace with "Lover Boy"

Their name changed for a third time, officially becoming Apeace (without a dash). They released their debut mini-album in June 2011 called "We Are the One" as well as a music video for the song "Lover Boy" on 7 September 2011. The group was split into three sub-units with 7 members each: Lapis, Jade, and Onyx. Jeong Eun-ho was replaced by Lee Tae-woo.

They were cited in Japan by programs such as Sankei Sports and Kuraberu Kurabera. In addition, a special program covering the group's debut was aired by Fuji TV. Members Son Yu-chang, Kim Seung-hwan, Lee Tae-woo, Hwang Doo-hwan, Hong Sung-ho and Song Seung-hyuk appeared on a food program called K-COOK.

On 11 May 2011, Apeace opened K Theater in Yebisu Garden Place in Ebisu, Tokyo and performed daily concerts until December 2014.

On 28 November 2011, Son Yu-chang left to continue studying composition and Lee Sung-woo left because of backache issues. They were replaced by Kim Won-shik and Lee Myung-eun, respectively. After recovering, Lee Sung-woo pursued a career as a drama musical actor.

2012: Japanese Debut with "We Are the One" and major debut with "Hero"
In March 2012, Apeace released a mini album called "We Are the One" in Japan. The song was used for their first commercial, for Glico Bitte. They held their first fan tour in Seoul in April, 2012.

On September 29, they launched their major Japanese debut with the release of their first full-length album called "1st ALBUM Apeace." The promotional video for the title track "HERO" was released on 1 September 2012.

During this time, members Yoo Dong-ho, Jee Hyun-sung, Song Seung-hyuk, Kim Won-sik, Kim Jin-woo, and Lee Tae-woo appeared on the "Language of Love" segment of NOTTV's program Bidanshikai. From June 10 to July 1, members Hwang Du-hwan and Song Seung-hyuk appeared on HBC's program Sega Sammy Cup.

2013: Japanese comeback with "X.O.X.O. ~Dreams~ / Never too late" and "Ur My Life"

By January 14, Apeace had performed a thousand concerts in Japan.

Apeace released a single album on February 13, 2013 titled "X.O.X.O. ~Dreams~/Never too late," to celebrate Valentine's Day. From March 8–11, they held their second fan tour in Seoul from March 8–11. 700 Japanese fans traveled to Korea with them. A fanmeeting was held at Konkuk University and a concert was held at Lotte World. ONYX member Song Seung-hyuk did not travel with them because he was admitted to the hospital in Japan on March 6 due to pneumothorax.

ONYX member Hwang Doo-hwan became a regular host on season 2 of NHK's weekly program Hangul Class (ハングル講座), starting on April 1, along with Koichi Akira, Ai Haruna, and 2PM.

Members Kim Seung-hyung, Kim Seung-hwan, and Jeong Ho-young left Apeace on April 23 to fulfill their mandatory military service. They were replaced by Yun Jun-sik, Kim Doo-hee, and Yoo Jae-deok (J.D), respectively.

On August 20, Apeace held two large concerts: "Apeace the 21 Live -3 Jewels-" and "Apeace the 21 Live -21 Jewels-" at Zepp Tokyo.

Apeace released the promotional video for their single "Ur My Life" on September 13 and released the album on October 16, which landed 11th on the Oricon Singles Chart.

On December 4, JADE member Ha Geon-hee was removed from the group's activities due to allegedly dating a fan. The following month, he resumes activities with Apeace.

2014: Japanese comeback with "VEIL" and member graduation
On 17 February 2014, Apeace won a leadership award at the Republic of Korea Record Culture Awards.

ONYX member Lee Myung-eun was fired from Apeace on March 1. It was later revealed that he married someone in South Korea on March 15 and would not be returning to Apeace. He was replaced by Choi Sihyuk on April 9.

Apeace released a promotional video for their third Japanese single entitled "VEIL" on April 30. As part of their promotional events for VEIL, they held two large concerts on May 10 at the concert series LIVE ARCH, vol. 11 at the Tokyo International Forum.

On June 30, 6 members graduated from Apeace: Yoo Dong-ho, Park Jae-won, Mun Byeong-hun, Heo Chang-woo, Kim Doo-hee, and Lee Tae-woo. This left 15 members that were rearranged into 3 groups of 5: LAPIS5, JADE5, and ONYX5. Their promotions at K Theater continued as usual with these new subgroups starting July 5.

Apeace released a compilation album entitled "For You" on December 5, featuring solo songs by members Kim Wan-chul, Yoo Jae-deok, Oh Se-hyeon, Jeong Young-wook, and Hong Sung-ho. Apeace's second full-length album entitled "Colors" was released in Japan on December 24 and reached #5 on the Oricon Daily Albums Chart for December 23.

2015: After K Theater

From their debut in Japan until their last performance at K Theater, Apeace had a total of 2199 daily performances and a cumulative audience of over 330,000 people. Apeace had their last performance at K Theater on 31 December 2014. They announced that they would be joint managed by Universal Music & EMI Artists and that they would have regular monthly performances, starting with 【Apeace LIVE 2015 ♯0(ZERO)】 on January 25 at Tokyo Mielparque Hall. In addition to monthly concerts, Apeace members have additional solo concerts during each of their birthdays.

Members Choi Young-won and Jeong Young-wook were cast in the musical On Air Night Flight, along with Teen Top's Chunji, U-KISS's Jun and Kevin Woo, and Supernova's Yunhak. It ran from February 5 to 12. In June, members Hong Sung-ho and Jung Young-uk were cast in the musical RUN TO YOU Street Life along with U-KISS's Soohyun and Jun, Supernova's Kwangsoo and Geonil, and Block B's Jaehyo and U-Kwon. It ran from June 26 to July 5.

Members Jee Hyun-sung and Kim Jin-woo enlisted in the military on February 24 and are scheduled to return on 19 November 2016. On March 3, it was announced that Min Jin-hong would rest indefinitely from Apeace activities due to poor condition of his knees and lumbar vertebrae. He remains a member of Apeace as a stage adviser. From March, Apeace continued to perform as a 12-member group.

In July, Apeace embarked on a fan tour to Hawaii which lasted from the 9th to the 14th.

Apeace received a trophy for Japan-Korea Diplomatic Normalization 50th Anniversary on July 19. They performed at the anniversary concert on the 20th along with other artists such as Supernova, Kim Da-hyun, Crazy Ken Band, ZERO, and Tendo Yoshimi.

A new subunit called FLOWERS debuted on August 3 at Tokyo FM Hall. It is composed of four members: Wan-chul, Young-uk, Si-hyuk, and J.D.

Apeace performed at A-Nation's concert "Asia Progress~Future~" on August 6 at Yoyogi National Gymnasium, alongside artists such as Hazzie, Solidemo, Tensai Bonjin, and sh**tkingz with guests from AAA and Da-ice They also performed at Meiji Jingu Stadium for the 2015 Jingu Gaien Fireworks Festival on August 11.

Apeace celebrated their fifth anniversary since their debut (as Double B 21 in 2010) with the release of "5th Anniv Best 'Pray for…'" on October 21. On November 18, they released a single album "Just Once Again" with an accompanying PV. "Just Once Again" contains the theme song to their new ODS: Once Again, Apeace's first starring movie. Once Again was screened in theaters around Shinjuku from November 21–27.

2021: Disbandment
On September 29, 2021, their Japanese agency CONTAINER announced that the group will be disbanding in the end of December.

Timeline 

Red (horizontal) = Active
Black (horizontal) = Inactive

Members
Adapted from the group's official website.

Current members

Subgroup Lapis5
 Jung Young-uk (정영욱)
 Choi Si-hyuk (최시혁)

Subgroup Jade5
 Ha Geon-hee (하건희) 
 Yoo Jae-deok (J.D) (유재덕)
 Kim Won-sik (김원식)
 Choi Young-won (최영원)

Subgroup Onyx5
 Ji Hyun-sung (지현성)
 Song Seung-hyuk (송승혁)
 Hong Sung-ho (홍성호)
 Kim Jin-woo (김진우)

On hiatus

 Yun Jun-sik (윤준식) - in military
 Kim Wan-chul (김완철) - in military

Former members

Subgroup Lapis
 Kim Seung-hyung (김승형) - left April 23, 2013
 Moon Byung-hun (문병훈) - graduated June 30, 2014
 Heo Chang-woo (허창우) - graduated June 30, 2014
 Min Jin-hong (민진홍) - left July 29, 2018
 Oh Se-hyeon (오세현) - left July 29, 2018

Subgroup Jade
 Son Yu-chang (손유창) - left November 28, 2011
 Kim Seung-hwan (김승환) - left April 23, 2013
 Yoo Dong-ho (유동호) - graduated June 30, 2014
 Park Jae-won (박재원) - graduated June 30, 2014
 Kim Doo-hee (김두희) - graduated June 30, 2014
 Hwang Du-hwan (황두환) - left July 29, 2018

Subgroup Onyx
 Lee Sung-woo (이성우) - left November 28, 2011
 Jeong Ho-young (정호영) [now Jeong Da-ho (정다호)] - left April 23, 2013
 Lee Myung-eun (이명은) - fired March 1, 2014
 Lee Tae-woo (이태우) - graduated June 30, 2014

Discography

Studio albums

Singles

Videography

Music videos

Promotional videos

Commercials

Film

References

External links

 Official Japanese website

Japanese pop music groups
Musical groups established in 2011
South Korean boy bands
South Korean expatriates in Japan
2011 establishments in South Korea
2021 disestablishments in South Korea